The 2016 Italian Basketball Supercup was the 22nd edition of the super cup tournament, organized by the Lega Basket Serie A. It was also called Macron Supercoppa 2016 for sponsorship reasons.

It was played in the Mediolanum Forum in Milan on 24 and 25 September.

EA7 Emporio Armani Milano won its first title after beating Vanoli Cremona in the semifinal and Sidigas Avellino in the final.

Participant teams
Qualified for the tournament were EA7 Emporio Armani Milano, Sidigas Avellino, Grissin Bon Reggio Emilia and Vanoli Cremona.

Bracket

Semi-finals

Grissin Bon Reggio Emilia vs. Sidigas Avellino

EA7 Emporio Armani Milano vs. Vanoli Cremona

Final
EA7 Emporio Armani Milano lifted the Supercup trophy by downing Sidigas Avellino 72-90. Krunoslav Simon led the winners with 25 points on 5-of-7 three-point shots. Ricky Hickman added 15 while Zoran Dragić had 11 for Milan. Hickman had 9 points in the second quarter to make Milan get a double-digit lead, 34-44, at halftime. Dragić, Simon and Davide Pascolo allowed Milan to extend their margin to 51-67 after 30 minutes, enough to control the game until the final buzzer and lift its first Supercup trophy.

Sidigas Avellino vs. EA7 Emporio Armani Milano

References

External links
 Lega Basket website  Retrieved 23 June 2016

2016
Supercup